The 2009 Hansol Korea Open was a women's tennis tournament played on outdoor hard courts. It was the 6th edition of the event known that year as the Hansol Korea Open, and was part of the WTA International tournaments of the 2009 WTA Tour. It was held at the Seoul Olympic Park Tennis Center in Seoul, South Korea, from September 21 through September 27, 2009.

Entrants

Seeds

 1 Seeds are based on the rankings of September 14, 2009

Other entrants
The following players received wildcards into the singles main draw

  Yoo Mi
  Kim So-Jung
  Lee Ye-Ra

The following players received entry from the qualifying draw:

  Yurika Sema
  Chang Kai-Chen
  Sophie Ferguson
  Junri Namigata

Finals

Singles

 Kimiko Date-Krumm defeated  Anabel Medina Garrigues, 6–3, 6–3
Date-Krumm, one day short of her 39th birthday, became the second-oldest player in the Open era to win a singles title on the WTA Tour, after Billie Jean King, who won the Edgbaston Cup at Birmingham in 1983 aged 39 and seven months. 
It was her 1st title after 13 years break, and the 8th of her career.

Doubles

 Chan Yung-jan /  Abigail Spears defeated  Carly Gullickson /  Nicole Kriz, 6–3, 6–4

External links
 Official website
 Singles, Doubles, and Qualifying Singles draws

Hansol Korea Open
Korea Open (tennis)
Korea